The Battle of Erzurum was a military engagement fought between the Ottoman Empire and the Russian Empire, during the Russo-Turkish War of 1877-1878. The battle was fought on 8-9 November 1877 on the Ottoman territory and ended with the Russians withdrawing to instead besiege Kars, which fell afterwards.

On 4 November 1877 the Russian army achieved a victory at Uzunahmet, having inflicted heavy casualties on the Turks, which included 3,000 killed and wounded, 1,000 prisoners and 42 artillery pieces left by the panicked gunners, with a loss of only 1,200 men. Although the Turkish troops ceased resistance and were fleeing in disarray, with 4,000 of them deserting the army, a part of their infantry maintained order and retreated to the well-fortified position in Erzurum with 14 guns. The Russians, being miles away and exhausted by the battle, did not chase them and therefore missed a chance to capture Erzurum on the heels of the fleeing enemy. Having developed a plan of assault on the stronghold, the Russian army advanced under the cover of night, but had difficulties of movement control in the dark. A part of their troops from the 153rd Infantry Regiment mistook their direction and captured one of the redoubts, Aziziye, all by themselves, without help from the rest of the army, but had to leave it due to the lack of support. All the three Turkish battalions stationed in the Aziziye redoubt were routed, numbering 1,600, whereas the Russians lost 400 or 600 men in this battle. After the Russians left Aziziye, the Turks made an attempt to counterattack them, but were successfully driven back. As the works of Erzurum were too strong to be taken by assault, the siege park was needed at Kars and in the following days the weather set in with a snowstorm, the Russians decided to withdraw their army and instead attack Kars, which they succeeded in capturing. Ahmed Muhtar Pasha, the Ottoman commander during the siege, requested reinforcements from Istanbul and was receiving them all through November. After epidemics broke out, he withdrew his forces to Bayburt for the remainder of the war. Muhtar Pasha was awarded the title Ghazi for his role in the defence of Erzurum, Gedikler and Yahniler. Despite the lack of defences, there would be no Russian assaults into the city. A low-scale siege would be conducted by the Russian Army until the truce on 31st of January 1878. Erzurum would be given to Russia under the terms of the Treaty of San Stefano that would later be revoked.

Third-party reports on the battle for Fort Aziziye speak of mutilations being inflicted on the Russian soldiers. C. B. Norman recorded that

References

Battles of the Russo-Turkish War (1877–1878)
Erzurum
November 1877 events